Streptomyces fabae is a bacterium species from the genus of Streptomyces which has been isolated from rhizosphere soil from the soybean (Glycine max) from Gyeonggi Siheung Sorae in Korea. Streptomyces fabae has anti-microbiology activity.

See also 
 List of Streptomyces species

References

External links 

Type strain of Streptomyces fabae at BacDive -  the Bacterial Diversity Metadatabase

fabae
Bacteria described in 2015